Chaplin is a 1992 biographical comedy-drama film about the life of English comedian Charlie Chaplin. It was produced and directed by Richard Attenborough and stars Robert Downey Jr., Marisa Tomei, Dan Aykroyd, Penelope Ann Miller and Kevin Kline. It also features Charlie Chaplin's own daughter, Geraldine Chaplin, in the role of his mother, Hannah Chaplin.

The film was adapted by William Boyd, Bryan Forbes and William Goldman from Chaplin's 1964 book My Autobiography and the 1985 book Chaplin: His Life and Art by film critic David Robinson. Associate producer Diana Hawkins got a story credit. The original music score was composed by John Barry. The film received mixed reviews; Downey's titular performance, however, garnered critical acclaim and won him the BAFTA Award for Best Actor along with nominations for the Academy Award for Best Actor and Golden Globe Award for Best Actor – Motion Picture Drama.

Plot
An elderly Charlie Chaplin reminisces during a conversation with George Hayden, the fictionalized editor of his autobiography.

Chaplin escapes his poverty-stricken childhood by immersing himself in the world of London's variety circuit. After his mother Hannah loses her voice onstage, five-year-old Charlie takes her place. Hannah is eventually committed to an asylum after developing psychosis. Over the years, Chaplin and his brother Sydney gain work with variety producer Fred Karno, who later sends him to the United States. He begins a relationship with dancer Hetty Kelly and soon proposes to her, but she declines, reasoning she is too young. He vows to return when he is a success.

In America, Chaplin is employed by famous comedy producer Mack Sennett. He creates the Tramp persona, and due to the terrible directorial abilities of Sennett's girlfriend Mabel Normand, he becomes his own director. After Sydney becomes his manager, Chaplin breaks from Sennett to gain complete creative control over his films, with the goal of one day owning his own studio. In 1917, he completes work on his politically sensitive The Immigrant and starts a brief relationship with actress Edna Purviance.

Years later, at a party thrown by Douglas Fairbanks, Chaplin dates child actress Mildred Harris. He sets up his own studio and becomes "the most famous man in the world" before his 30th birthday. Chaplin tells Fairbanks that he must marry Harris because she is pregnant, but later learns it is a hoax. Chaplin has a confrontation with J. Edgar Hoover about actor/directors and propaganda. This sparks a 40-year-long vendetta by Hoover.

Harris's divorce lawyers claim Chaplin's film The Kid as an asset. Chaplin and Sydney flee with the footage, finish editing it in a Salt Lake City hotel, then smuggle it back to Los Angeles.

The brothers arrange for their mother to join them, but Chaplin cannot cope with her worsened condition. In 1921, Chaplin attends the UK premiere of The Kid. He hopes to locate Hetty, but Karno informs him that she died in the influenza epidemic. Chaplin also discovers although most are happy to see him, the British working class resent him for not fighting in World War I as they did.

Back in America, Hoover digs into Chaplin's private life, suspecting him of communist sympathies. Chaplin is forced to consider the effect of "talkies" on his career. Despite the popularity of sound films, he vows never to make a talkie featuring the Tramp.

In 1925, Chaplin makes The Gold Rush and marries bit-part actress Lita Grey. However, he later confides to George that he always thought of her as a "total bitch" and barely mentions her in his autobiography. Chaplin marries Paulette Goddard and feels a sense of guilt and sympathy for the millions unemployed due to the Wall Street Crash (Chaplin sold most of his shares the year before the crash). Chaplin decides to address the issue in his next movie, Modern Times, but his dedication to the film results in the breakup of his marriage.

At an industry party, Chaplin refuses to shake hands with a visiting Nazi. Fairbanks comments that Chaplin resembles Adolf Hitler, providing him with the inspiration for his next film. The Great Dictator satirizes the Nazis and is a huge hit worldwide, but Hoover tries to portray it as anti-American propaganda.

Chaplin finally settles down and marries Oona O'Neill, an actress who strikingly resembles Hetty. However, it is alleged that he is the father of the child of former lover Joan Barry. Despite a blood test proving that the child is not his, Chaplin is ordered to provide financial support. With his reputation severely damaged, he stays out of the public eye for over seven years until producing Limelight. During the height of McCarthyism, Chaplin leaves America with Oona on a visit to Britain, but the United States Attorney General revokes his permit to re-enter the United States.

In 1972, Chaplin is invited back to America to receive a special Academy Honorary Award. Though he is initially resentful at his exile and fearful that no one will remember him, he is moved to tears when the audience is seen laughing at his films and give him the Academy Awards' longest standing ovation.

Cast

Production
Attenborough acquired the rights to Chaplin's biography in 1988, and intended to make it with Universal. According to Marc Wanamaker, who served as an advisor on the film, Attenborough had thought of making a miniseries at one point, to fully explore Chaplin's life. Although Richard Attenborough wanted Robert Downey Jr. for the part of Chaplin, studio executives wanted Robin Williams or Billy Crystal for the role. Jim Carrey was also considered. On David Letterman’s Netflix series My Next Guest Needs No Introduction, Downey Jr. revealed that Attenborough had also been interested in Tom Cruise for the role. The film had a four hour cut that was later edited down to two and a half hours for release.

Release

Critical reception
The film received mixed reviews, lauded for its high production values, but many critics dismissed it as an overly glossy biopic. Although the film was criticized for taking dramatic license with some aspects of Chaplin's life, Downey's performance as Chaplin won universal acclaim. Attenborough was sufficiently confident in Downey's performance to include historical footage of Chaplin himself at the end of the film.

According to the review aggregator website Rotten Tomatoes, 59% of critics have given Chaplin a positive review based on 54 reviews, with an average rating of 5.7/10. The website's critics consensus reads, "Chaplin boasts a terrific performance from Robert Downey, Jr. in the title role, but it isn't enough to overcome a formulaic biopic that pales in comparison to its subject's classic films." At Metacritic, the film has a weighted average score of 47 out of 100 based on 22 critics, indicating "mixed or average reviews". Vincent Canby of The New York Times lauded Downey's performance, and deemed the film "extremely appreciative". Todd McCarthy of Variety remarked that Chaplin's life was too grand to properly capture in a film, criticizing the screenplay, but praised the casting and the film's first hour.

Roger Ebert of The Chicago Sun-Times gave the film two stars, dubbing the film, "a disappointing, misguided movie that has all of the parts in place to be a much better one", but praised Downey and the production values. Kenneth Turan of the Los Angeles Times felt Attenborough's filmmaking and Chaplin's life were ill-suited to each other, but said of Downey, "Lithe and lively and looking remarkably like the younger Chaplin, Downey does more than master the man’s celebrated duck walk and easy grace. In one of those acts of will and creativity that actors come up with when you least expect it, Downey becomes Chaplin, re-creating his character and his chilly soul so precisely that even the comedian’s daughter Geraldine, a featured player here, was both impressed and unnerved."

Box office
The film grossed £1.8 million ($2.7 million) in the United Kingdom and $9.5 million in the United States.

Awards and nominations

Home media
The film was released on VHS and LaserDisc in 1993 and later on DVD in 1997, and on LaserDisc by Live Home Video on July 5, 1998. A 15th-anniversary edition was released by Lions Gate Entertainment (who obtained the distribution rights to the film in the interim under license from the copyright holder, StudioCanal) in 2008. The anniversary edition contained extensive interviews with the producers, and included several minutes of home-movie footage shot on Chaplin's yacht. The box for this DVD mistakenly lists the film's running time as 135 minutes, although it retains the 143-minute length of the original theatrical release.

The 15th Anniversary Edition was later released on Blu-ray on February 15, 2011.

Soundtrack
The soundtrack to Chaplin was released on December 15, 1992.

A newly expanded soundtrack with 35 tracks to celebrate the film's 30 anniversary was released by La La Land Records in 2023.

Track listing

References

External links
 
 
 
 
 

1992 films
1990s biographical films
1990s historical comedy-drama films
American biographical films
American historical comedy-drama films
BAFTA winners (films)
Biographical films about actors
British biographical films
British historical comedy-drama films
Carolco Pictures films
Comedy-drama films based on actual events
Cultural depictions of Charlie Chaplin
Cultural depictions of Laurel & Hardy
Cultural depictions of J. Edgar Hoover
Films scored by John Barry (composer)
Films about comedians
Films about filmmaking
Films about the Hollywood blacklist
Films based on autobiographies
Films based on biographies
Films based on multiple works
Films directed by Richard Attenborough
Films produced by Richard Attenborough
Films set in London
Films set in Los Angeles
Films set in Switzerland
Films set in the 1890s
Films set in the 1900s
Films set in 1917
Films set in 1921
Films set in 1923
Films set in the 1930s
Films set in the 1940s
Films set in 1952
Films set in the 1960s
Films set in 1972
Films shot in California
Films shot in Switzerland
Films shot in England
Films with screenplays by William Goldman
Films with screenplays by William Boyd (writer)
Films with screenplays by Bryan Forbes
StudioCanal films
TriStar Pictures films
1990s English-language films
1990s American films
1990s British films